Abel Foullon (1513–1563 or 1565, in France) was an author, director of the Mint for Henry II of France and also an engineer to the king of France after Leonardo da Vinci.

His Holometer is an instrument for making of angular measurements for surveying.  In 1551, Henry II granted Abel a 10-year exclusive patent monopoly on the holometer in exchange for publishing a description of it. A description of an invention in a patent is called a patent “specification”. This first patent specification was entitled "Usage & Description de l'holomètre".  Publication was delayed until after the patent expired in 1561.

Bibliography
 Abel Foullon, Usage et description de l'holomètre, Paris: P. Béguin, 1567.
 Chevalier de Brunet-Varennes: Holometer, oder neues sehr genaues Instrument, um Zeichnungen in der Geometrie, so wie alle Zeichnungen nach der Perspectiv-Kunst zu erleichtern. 15 S. Mit 1 Taf. In: Polytechnisches Journal. Hrsg. J. G. Dingler. Bd. 34.; Erschienen: Stuttgart, Cotta, 1829.

References

External links

 http://wissensgeschichte.biblhertz.it/Glossario/Glossario_Italiano/olometro/ 
 https://web.archive.org/web/20070929202456/http://www.nv-landsurveyors.org/files/Topographic_Mapping_ACSM_Student_Competition.pdf

1513 births
1560s deaths
French engineers